This is a timeline documenting the events of heavy metal in the year 1969.

Newly formed bands 
 April Wine
 Argent
 Atomic Rooster
 Bang
 Blackfoot
 Bloodrock
Blue Mountain Eagle
Blues Creation
Brownsville Station
 Cactus
 Coven
 Crushed Butler
 Dust
Faces 
Focus 
Elonkorjuu  
Epitaph  
 Gary Moore
Grand Funk Railroad
Granicus 
 Hawkwind
 High Tide
Hookfoot
Humble Pie
 Iron Claw
 Josefus
 Judas Priest
 King Crimson
 Leaf Hound
Little Free Rock
 May Blitz
Morly Grey
 Mott the Hoople
 Mountain
Neon Rose
November
 Thin Lizzy
Titanic
Toe Fat
Trapeze 
Truth and Janey 
 Tucky Buzzard
 UFO
 Uriah Heep
 Wishbone Ash
 ZZ Top

Albums 
 The Jeff Beck Group - Beck-Ola
Blossom Toes - If Only for a Moment
 Blue Cheer - New! Improved! Blue Cheer
 Blue Cheer - Blue Cheer
 Alice Cooper - Pretties for You
 Coven - Witchcraft Destroys Minds and Reaps Souls
 Cream - Goodbye
 Deep Purple - Deep Purple
 Edgar Broughton Band - Wasa Wasa
 Grand Funk Railroad - On Time
 Grand Funk Railroad - Grand Funk
 High Tide - Sea Shanties
 Humble Pie - As Safe As Yesterday Is
 Humble Pie - Town and Country
 Iron Butterfly - Ball
James Gang - Yer' Album
 King Crimson - In the Court of the Crimson King
 The Kinks - Arthur (Or the Decline and Fall of the British Empire)
Little Free Rock - Little Free Rock
 Led Zeppelin - Led Zeppelin
 Led Zeppelin - Led Zeppelin II
 MC5 - Kick Out the Jams
Morgen  - Morgen
 Mott the Hoople - Mott the Hoople
 Slade - Beginnings
 Steppenwolf - At Your Birthday Party
 Steppenwolf - Monster
 The Stooges - The Stooges
 Vanilla Fudge - Near the Beginning
 Vanilla Fudge - Rock & Roll
Leslie West - Mountain 
 The Who - Tommy
Writing on the Wall - The Power of the Picts

References 

1960s in heavy metal music
Metal